Deokjin-gu is a non-autonomous district in the City of Jeonju in North Jeolla Province, South Korea.

Administrative divisions 
Deokjin-gu is divided into 15 neighbourhoods (dong).

See also 
 Wansan-gu

References

External links 
  

Districts of Jeonju